Achomi, also called Khodmooni, Lari, or Larestani, are an Iranian sub-ethnic group of Persians who inhabit primarily in southern Iran in a region historically known as Laristan. They are predominantly Sunni Muslims, with a Shia minority. Significant numbers of Achomi people have migrated to Kuwait, Bahrain, Qatar, UAE, and other Arab states of the Persian Gulf. 

The historical region of Irahistan consists of several counties in Fars Province (Larestan, Khonj, Gerash, Lamerd) and Bastak County in Hormozgan. In Bahrain, Sunni Bahrainis of Achomi ancestry are known as Hola. In Kuwait, they are known as Kandari and Awadhi. 

Achomi people speak the Achomi language. The language is in decline and has reported eight dialects and it is understood by mainstream Persian speakers mostly. The Achomi people are of Persian descent.  

In the thirteenth century, Lar briefly became a center of trade and commerce in southern Persia. Irahistan was nearly always an obscure region, never becoming involved in the politics and conflicts of mainstream Persia. This was due to independent rule during the Safavid times, but that has failed due to the British Empire "Anti Piracy Company" and continued to decline due to Reza Shah Pahlavi's centric policies and the Ayatollah policies. Ahmad Eghtedari noted in his book Ancient Larestan (1955): 
 
"To those people of the towns, villages, and ports of Larestan who have stayed in the land of their ancestors, with its glorious past and its desolate present.  And to those who have endured the hardship of migration to earn a living on the islands of the Persian Gulf and the Indian Ocean and in the towns of India, Arabia and other places.  They remember with joy their beloved birthplace and still grieve for its ruin." 

Achomi people refer to themselves as Khodmooni, a term literally meaning "part of ourselves"

References

Iranian peoples
Ethnic groups in Iran